The Liechtensteinische Landesbibliothek (in English: Liechtenstein State Library) is the legal deposit and copyright library for Liechtenstein.

Legal basis and tasks
The Liechtenstein State Library, locally known as the State Library, was established by law in 1961 by the National Library Foundation. The State Library possesses a legal depository. Aside from forming the library itself, the National Library Foundation also provides librarians’ commissions. The governing board members are appointed by the national government, which also acts as the supervisory body of the Foundation. 
The State Teachers Library, founded in 1906, was incorporated as a separate department via elected decision by the teachers’ conference three-member Commission and also by the State Board of Education. 
The Office of the Librarian, which governs the National Library Foundation, amended the statutes for the separation. The amended statutes changed the roles of the State Library; it now functions as a national library as well as a scientific and public library. As a national library, the State Library collects print materials, pictures and music created by national citizens, as well as items related to Liechtenstein. The State Library also acts as a patent library for Liechtenstein and as such provides access to comprehensive international patent information. The State Library's rules and regulations must follow the current legislation under Liechtenstein's European Economic Area as well as Swiss legislation.

Library inventory
As of 2012, the State Library contained about 250,000 items, with nearly 130,000 loans out to 3,956 library patrons. 2,524 of these patrons are from Liechtenstein and 1,432 people are from the local region. In 1999, the State Library's online library system joined with Ex Libris’ Aleph 500. This automated tracking system provides the library catalogues for every public library in and outside of the Liechtenstein region. The State Library is an associate member of the Information Network of German Switzerland. In addition, the State Library is participating in the Dandelon.com project, in which the Liechtenstein State Library is scanning their materials for online access; this also includes materials which the University of Liechtenstein donated to the library in 2003.

In August 2012 the State Library mounted Project eLiechtensteinesia, which provides online access to scans of the Yearbook of the Historical Society for the Principality of Liechtenstein, old national newspapers, and other publications from Liechtenstein.

See also
 List of libraries in Austria
 List of libraries in Germany

References

External links
 Official site 

Government buildings in Liechtenstein
Liechtenstein culture
Liechtenstein
Deposit libraries
Libraries in Liechtenstein